Gooning is a form of legal kidnapping in which parents hire rehabilitation organizations to seize children they perceive as troubled and transport them against their will to boot camps, behavior modification facilities, residential treatment centers, substance abuse treatment facilities, wilderness therapy, or therapeutic boarding school. In most cases, the organizations send a group of large, intimidating men to show up by surprise and force the teenager into a vehicle, often under cover of darkness.

Though not illegal, the practice is traumatic for the child. Children who resist are frequently threatened, restrained with handcuffs or zip ties, blindfolded, or hooded. Children who are gooned frequently report post traumatic stress disorder, problems sleeping at night, and recurring nightmares into adulthood. Paris Hilton's documentary This Is Paris details her experience at age 17 with gooning, culminating in her transport to Provo Canyon School where she was abused.

The practice is regulated in the U.S. state of Oregon, where restraints, hoods, and blindfolds are disallowed. Lawmakers in California and Utah have criticized the practice of gooning and begun attempts to regulate the industry in those states as well.

See also 
 Troubled teen industry

References 

Human rights abuses
Kidnapping
Punishments